Striglina is a genus of moths of the family Thyrididae described by Achille Guenée in 1877.

Description
Palpi upturned and thickly scaled. The third joint short. Antennae minutely ciliate in male, simple in female. Femora and tibia hairy. Forewing with veins 8 and 9 from cell, veins 9 and 10 from some way before the angle. Hindwing with vein 5 from just above lower angle of cell.

Species
Striglina asinina Warren, 1899
Striglina augescere Whalley, 1971
Striglina bifida Chu & Wang, 1991
Striglina buergersi Gaede, 1922 (from Papua New Guinea)
Striglina cinnamomea (Rothschild, 1915)
Striglina clathrata (Hampson, 1897)
Striglina crassisquama (Warren, 1898)
Striglina eguttalis Gaede, 1917
Striglina ferula Whalley, 1971
Striglina guttistigma Hampson, 1906
Striglina indistincta Gaede, 1922 (from Papua New Guinea)
Striglina jacanda Whalley, 1971
Striglina lineola Guenée, 1877
Striglina meridiana Whalley, 1976
Striglina minutula (Saalmuller, 1880)
Striglina navigatorum (Felder & Rogenhofer, 1874)
Striglina nigranalis (Warren, 1903)
Striglina propatula Whalley, 1974
Striglina ramosa Whalley, 1971
Striglina rothi Warren, 1898
Striglina roseus Gaede 1932
Striglina rufuscens Gaede, 1922 ( from Assam)
Striglina scitaria (Walker, 1862)
Striglina strigifera (Strand, 1913)
Striglina strigosa (Moore, 1882) (from India)
Striglina suzukii Matsumura, 1921 (from Japan)
Striglina tibiaria (Walker, 1859)
Striglina tincta Whalley, 1971
Striglina trepida Whalley, 1971
Striglina venia Whalley, 1976

References

External links

Gaede, 1922. Striglina scitaria Wlkr. und verwandte Arten (Lepid. Thyrididen). Deutsche Entomologische Zeitschrift. 

Thyrididae
Moth genera